The Smokey Robinson Show was a 1970 musical variety special starring Smokey Robinson & The Miracles. It aired on ABC on December 18, 1970, and featured guest stars The Supremes, The Temptations, Stevie Wonder, and Las Vegas singer/performer and actress Fran Jeffries. The program was sponsored by Faberge and was produced by Screen Gems. The director was Kip Walton.

Originally intended to be Smokey's sendoff into a solo career, the massive success of The Miracles' 1970 # 1 smash hit, "The Tears of a Clown" delayed his departure for another 2 years (strangely, that song was not sung on the special). Filmed at the height of success of Motown Records, this special was essentially a launching pad for Smokey's solo career and to prepare the public for his upcoming departure from the legendary Miracles - the very first of the Motown groups. The Miracles, however, were not at full strength, at the time of taping: Miracle Pete Moore was absent from the special, having been sidelined by a leg injury shortly before filming, and Claudette (Mrs. Smokey) Robinson, another original Miracle, did not appear on the special. Miracle Marv Tarplin was present, but did not appear on camera. Thus, the only Miracles present were Smokey, Ronnie White, and Bobby Rogers, who began the show with their 1963 Top 10 smash hit "Mickey's Monkey" at the show's intro, and followed up with a medley of 3 of their greatest hits, "More Love", "If You Can Want", and "I Second That Emotion".

Other performances
This hit-filled special featured the following performances:
 The Temptations sang and performed their then-current hit single, "Ball of Confusion", then joined Smokey on one of the hit songs he wrote for them, "Get Ready".
 The Supremes sang their first post-Diana Ross hit, "Up the Ladder to the Roof".
 Stevie Wonder performed his hit "My Cherie Amour" .
 Fran Jeffries sang and performed "Something's Coming On", and then shared vocals with Smokey and Stevie on his hit, "Signed, Sealed, Delivered I'm Yours".
 Smokey sang a medley of The Beatles' hit "Something" combined with the Chris Kenner song "Something You Got", made a hit by Chuck Jackson and Maxine Brown, (and which appeared on The Miracles' 1970 album, "A Pocket Full of Miracles"), and then joined the rest of The Miracles in a rendition of The Impressions' People Get Ready.
 Also notable was a "Motown Memories" segment, where the Miracles and the entire cast sat around reminiscing about Motown's early days, and did a "hits tribute" to Smokey and his composed songs for The Miracles and other Motown acts.(almost all of these songs were co-written by the other members of The Miracles, Bobby Rogers, Pete Moore, Ronnie White, and Marv Tarplin)
 The entire cast joined in for the show's finale, with The Miracles at center stage, singing and performing an exciting rendition of Gladys Knight & The Pips' Motown hit, "Friendship Train".

Complete list of performances
. Intro 2:21-The Miracles-Mickey's Monkey
. Smokey & The Miracles - Hits Medley: 4:27
· If You Can Want
· More Love
· I Second That Emotion

. The Supremes - Up the Ladder to the Roof 3:35
. The Supremes & Smokey Robinson - Someday We'll Be Together 4:05

. Stevie Wonder - Medley: 5:48
· My Cherie Amour
· Signed, Sealed, Delivered I'm Yours

. Fran Jeffries - Something's Coming On 3:15
. Stevie Wonder, Smokey Robinson & Fran Jeffries - For Once in My Life 2:36

. The Temptations - Ball Of Confusion (That's What The World Is Today) 4:13
. The Temptations & Smokey Robinson - Get Ready 4:07

. Smokey Robinson Tribute song Medley: 6:35
· The Miracles & The Temptations - Special Occasion
· Stevie Wonder - My Girl
· The Supremes - My Guy
· Dennis Edwards - It's Growing
· Fran Jeffries & Eddie Kendricks - Shop Around
· The Miracles - Ain't That Peculiar
· Stevie Wonder - I'll Be Doggone
· The Supremes - Don't Mess With Bill
· The Temptations - The Way You Do The Things You Do
· Fran Jeffries - Ooo Baby Baby
  The Miracles - Since I Lost My Baby
· Fran Jeffries - You've Really Got A Hold On Me
· Entire cast - What Love Has Joined Together

. Smokey Robinson - Something 4:45

. Closing Medley: 7:38
· The Temptations - What The World Needs Now Is Love
· Fran Jeffries - People Got To Be Free
· Stevie Wonder - Walk A Mile In My Shoes
· The Supremes - Save the Country
· Smokey Robinson & The Miracles - People Get Ready
· Entire Cast - Friendship Train

Cast
The Miracles:

Smokey Robinson
Bobby Rogers
Ronnie White

The Supremes:
Mary Wilson
Cindy Birdsong
Jean Terrell

Stevie Wonder

 The Temptations:
Paul Williams
Eddie Kendricks
Melvin Franklin
Otis Williams
Dennis Edwards

Fran Jeffries

Note:  There has never been an official Motown DVD release of this special, but copies of it have been circulating in the "collectors market" for years, and are available on the internet.

Motown Records never released a soundtrack album of this special.

As of May 1, 2017, this special is being broadcast on Get TV.

References

External links
 The Smokey Robinson Show -starring Smokey Robinson & The Miracles -1970 (YouTube video)

1970 television specials
Motown Productions films
The Miracles
1970s American television specials
Motown
The Miracles video albums
Soul video albums
Rhythm and blues video albums
Video albums by American artists
Music television specials